Stauffer (also commonly spelled "Stouffer" and "Stover" in North America) is a German surname, the origin of which derives from the Proto-German word staupa, meaning "steep." Staupa and its Middle High German descendant, stouf, evolved to mean, among other things, a steep hill or mountain. Many of these hills and mountains serve as the basis for the names of such places as Donaustauf, Hohenstaufen, Staufenberg, Regenstauf, Staufen im Breisgau, and the Staufens of Switzerland and Austria. Stauffer surnames derive from these hills. The Swiss Mennonite Stauffers common in the U.S. and Canada derive their name from a hill called Stouffe or Stauffenalp just southwest of the town of Röthenbach im Emmental in Switzerland. 

Notable people with the surname include:

Brenda Stauffer (born 1961), former field hockey player
Christian Stauffer (born 1579), Swiss Anabaptist leader 
Dietrich Stauffer (1943–2019), German professor of theoretical physics at Cologne University
Ethelbert Stauffer (1902–1979), German Protestant theologian and numismatist
Grant Stauffer (1888–1949), American coal and railroad executive
Henry Stauffer (1724–1777), German Mennonite pioneer
Jack Stauffer (born 1945), American actor of film, television, and theater
Jamie Stauffer (born 1979), professional motorcycle racer
Jay Richard Stauffer Jr., American ichthyologist
Johann Georg Stauffer (1778–1853), Austrian luthier
John Stauffer (politician) (born 1925), former Republican member of the Pennsylvania House and Senate
John Stauffer (professor), American academic
Joseph Stauffer (1874–1917), Alberta Liberal Party MLA
Jürg M. Stauffer (born 1977), Swiss politician
Nathan Stauffer (19th century), first head football coach for the Dickinson College Red Devils
Rudolph Stauffer (1836–1918), First Sergeant in the 5th US Cavalry during the Indian- and Apache wars
Serge Stauffer (1929–1989), Swiss artist art educator
S. Walter Stauffer (1888–1975), United States Representative from Pennsylvania
Teddy Stauffer (1909–1993), Swiss-Mexican Swing Musician, Mr. Acapulco
Théodore Stauffer (1901–1971), Swiss boxer
Tim Stauffer (born 1982), Major League Baseball pitcher
Todd Stauffer (21st century), co-founder and publisher of the Jackson Free Press
Walter Stauffer McIlhenny (1910–1985), president of McIlhenny Company

See also 
Stauffer Chemical, chemical company of the United States which manufactured herbicides
Stauffer Communications, media company of the United States
Stauffer syndrome, constellation of signs and symptoms of liver dysfunction
Stauffer Mennonite
Hohenstaufen (disambiguation)

References

German-language surnames